Esteban González Pons (Valencia, Spain, 21 August 1964) is a Spanish politician of the People's Party (PP) who has been a Member of the European Parliament since 2014.

Early life and career
Married, and with three children, González Pons gained a doctorate in law and constitutional rights at University of Valencia and practised as a chess player.

Political career

Career in national politics
González Pons entered politics in 1993 serving as senator for Valencia province, in the process becoming the youngest member of the senate. He continued in that role until 2003, resigning after being chosen as minister of culture, education and sport in the Valencian regional parliament. He served as the PP spokesman from 2007 until 2008 when he was elected to the Spanish Congress of Deputies representing Valencia region. He headed the PP list for that election, virtually guaranteeing his election in a district where the PP and predecessors had won at least one seat at every election in the modern Spanish democratic era.

Member of the European Parliament, 2014–present
In early 2014, the PP chose González Pons to be party’s number 2 for the European elections, following Miguel Arias Cañete. As Member of the European Parliament, he has since been serving on the Committee on Budgets and the Committee on Constitutional Affairs. 

González Pons is also a member of the parliament’s delegations for relations with Israel and the Parliamentary Assembly of the Union for the Mediterranean. In addition to his committee assignments, he is a member of the European Parliament Intergroup on LGBT Rights; the European Parliament Intergroup on Children’s Rights; the European Parliament Intergroup on SMEs; and the European Parliament Intergroup on Sports.

When Arias Cañete was nominated as European Commissioner in late 2014, González Pons took over as leader of the Spanish delegation in the EPP Group. In addition, he co-chairs the EPP Justice and Home Affairs Ministers Meeting, alongside Thomas de Maizière (until 2018), Kai Mykkänen (2018–2019) and Pieter De Crem (2019–2020). He also chairs the EPP’s working group on Brexit. 

Following the 2019 elections, González Pons was part of a cross-party working group in charge of drafting the European Parliament's four-year work program on the rule of law, borders and migration.

Within the EPP group, González Pons is one of the deputies of chairman Manfred Weber. In 2021, he was appointed to the group's task force for proposing changes to its rules of procedure to allow for “the possibility of the collective termination of membership of a group of Members rather than just individual membership”, alongside Esther de Lange, Othmar Karas, Jan Olbrycht and Paulo Rangel.

Political positions
Following Brexit, González Pons joined Manfred Weber, David McAllister and Sandra Kalniete in co-signing a letter to President of the European Parliament David Sassoli to establish an EU-UK Joint Parliamentary Assembly.

In a joint letter with 15 other MEPs from various political groups, González Pons urged the High Representative of the Union for Foreign Affairs and Security Policy Josep Borrell in early 2021 to replace the European Union’s ambassador to Cuba for allegedly siding with the country’s Communist leadership.

References

External links 

Biography at Spanish Congress website
Biography at Levante newspaper site
Personal website

1964 births
Living people
Members of the 9th Congress of Deputies (Spain)
Members of the Senate of Spain
MEPs for Spain 2014–2019
MEPs for Spain 2019–2024
People from Valencia
People's Party (Spain) politicians
Politicians from the Valencian Community